Potassium tetrachloridocuprate(II) is a salt with chemical formula , also written as 2·[]2−.

The compound is often found as the dihydrate ·2, which is a brilliant greenish blue crystalline solid. This form also occurs naturally as the rare mineral mitscherlichite.

The compound is also called potassium tetrachlorocuprate(II), dipotassium tetrachlorocuprate, potassium copper(II) tetrachloride, potassium cupric chloride and other similar names.

Dihydrate

Synthesis and natural occurrence
The dihydrate occurs rarely in nature near volcanic vents, e.g. in Mount Vesuvius, as the mineral mitscherlichite; which is named in honor of Eilhardt Mitscherlich (1794–1863), the German crystallographer and chemist who
first synthesized the compound.  It was identified as pigment in some ancient artifacts.

The dihydrate can be obtained by slow evaporation of a solution of potassium chloride and copper(II) chloride in 2:1 molar ratio.

Crystal structure
The crystal structure of the dihydrate was partially determined in 1927 by Hendricks and Dickinson and refined in 1934 by Chrobak.  The structure is tetragonal P42/mnm (136), Z=2, isostructural with ammonium tetrachoridocuprate(II)2·2 and rubidium tetrachoridocuprate(II) ·2.  Each copper atom is immediately surrounded by two oxygen atoms and four chlorine atoms forming a hydrated tetrachloridocuprate(II) anion.  Two of the chlorine atoms are about 0.75 angstroms further away than the other two. Each potassium atom is surrounded by four oxygen atoms, four copper atoms and eight chlorine atoms.

Anhydrous

Synthesis

The anhydrous compound was reported in 1952 by C. M. Fontana and others.  In the next two decades others reported its heat of formation and its structure.

In the mid-1970s, however, its existence was questioned. The phase diagram for the anhydrous system / shows potassium trichloridocuprate  as a congruently-melting compound, but not .

The doubts were put to rest when successful dehydration was achieved by T. J. Nolan and others in 1975.

See also

 Potassium trichloridocuprate(II),

References

Potassium compounds
Copper(II) compounds
Copper complexes
Chloro complexes
Chlorometallates